Lori March (March 6, 1923 – March 19, 2013) was an American television actress. She was best known for her roles on daytime soap operas. Her obituary on the Television Academy's web site noted that she "was dubbed 'First Lady of Daytime Television.'"

Early years
March was born in Hollywood, California. She was the daughter of Theodore von Eltz, an actor, and Peggy Prior, a screenwriter. Poet Joseph Moncure March was her adoptive father. She attended Beverly Hills High School. She studied theatre at HB Studio in New York City.

Stage
March's Broadway credits include Giants, Sons of Giants (1961), The Chalk Garden (1955), and Charley's Aunt (1953).

Television
March played Lenore Bradley on the soap opera The Brighter Day. Her other soap operas and roles included Three Steps to Heaven (Jennifer), As the World Turns (Nurse Harris), The Secret Storm (Valerie Hill Ames Northcoate), One Life to Live (Adele Huddleston), The Edge of Night (Mrs. Hinson), Texas (Mildred Canfield), Another Life (Barbara Gilbert), The Guiding Light (Lady Agnes Gilmore), and Another World (Abigail Kramer). She appeared in 6 Perry Mason episodes including the role of defendant Edna Culross in the 1961 episode "The Case of the Posthumous Painter" and murderess Olive Omstead in the 1962 episode " The Case of the Capricious Corpse".

Personal life
In May 1943, March married actor Alexander Scourby.

Death
On March 19, 2013, March died at age 90 while sleeping in Redding, Connecticut.

Selected television credits
 
 Man Against Crime
 Three Steps to Heaven
 The Brighter Day
 The Secret Storm
 The Twilight Zone (Episode: "Third From the Sun")
 Dr. Kildare
 Perry Mason
 One Life to Live (two roles)
 The Edge of Night
 Texas

Film credits
 Ransom! (1956)
 Lovers and Lollipops (1956)

References

External links

 
 
 
 

1923 births
2013 deaths
Actresses from Los Angeles
American stage actresses
American television actresses
20th-century American actresses
American soap opera actresses
People from Redding, Connecticut
21st-century American women